Willis J. Hutnik (born March 23, 1915) was an American politician and businessman who served as a member of the Wisconsin State Assembly from 1954 to 1970.

Early life and education
Hutnik was born on March 23, 1915 in Elk, Wisconsin. He attended Phillips High School in Phillips, Wisconsin, Price County Normal School, Central State Teachers College in Ohio, and the University of Wisconsin–Madison.

Career 
Hutnik owned a school and office supply business in Tony, Wisconsin where he worked as a teacher, principal, and real estate broker. Hutnik was elected to the Wisconsin State Assembly in 1952. He was a Republican. Hutnik left office in 1970.

A bill proposing to name a portion of Wisconsin Highway 27 in Rusk County, Wisconsin and Sawyer County, Wisconsin the Willis J. Hutnik Memorial Highway was brought before the Wisconsin Legislature in 2012. After his death, Hutnik's papers were donated to the University of Wisconsin–Eau Claire.

Personal life 
Hutnik has four children. He died in Mesa, Arizona on December 13, 1996.

References

People from Price County, Wisconsin
Businesspeople from Wisconsin
Educators from Wisconsin
Republican Party members of the Wisconsin State Assembly
University of Wisconsin–Madison alumni
1915 births
1996 deaths
20th-century American businesspeople
20th-century American politicians
People from Rusk County, Wisconsin